Root Down may refer to:

 Root Down (EP), a 1995 EP by the Beastie Boys
 Root Down (album), a 1972 album by Jimmy Smith